German submarine U-337 was a Type VIIC U-boat of Nazi Germany's Kriegsmarine during World War II.

The submarine was laid down on 1 April 1941 at the Nordseewerke yard at Emden, launched on 26 March 1942, and commissioned on 6 May 1942 under the command of Oberleutnant zur See Kurt Ruwiedel.

Design
German Type VIIC submarines were preceded by the shorter Type VIIB submarines. U-337 had a displacement of  when at the surface and  while submerged. She had two shafts and two  propellers.

U-337 was fitted with five  torpedo tubes (four fitted at the bow and one at the stern), fourteen torpedoes, one  SK C/35 naval gun, 220 rounds, and a  C/30 anti-aircraft gun. The boat had a complement of between forty-four and sixty.

Armament

FLAK weaponry
U-337 was mounted with two 2cm Flak C38 in a M 43U Zwilling mount with short folding shield on the upper Wintergarten. The M 43U mount was used on a number of U-boats (and ).

Service history
After training with the 5th U-boat Flotilla at Kiel, U-337 was transferred to the 6th U-boat Flotilla based at Saint-Nazaire in France for front-line service. After sailing from Kiel on 24 December 1942, the U-boat sailed north and then west into the Atlantic south of Iceland. The U-boat was never heard from again. There is no explanation for its loss.

Previously recorded fate
A postwar assessment stated U-337 was sunk on 15 January 1943 southwest of Iceland by depth charges from a British Flying Fortress of No. 206 RAF. This attack was actually against U-632, inflicting no damage.

References

Bibliography

External links
 

German Type VIIC submarines
U-boats commissioned in 1942
Missing U-boats of World War II
World War II submarines of Germany
1942 ships
Ships built in Emden
U-boats sunk in 1943
U-boats sunk by unknown causes
Maritime incidents in January 1943